The Dance Scene is an American reality television series on E! that follows the lives of Laurieann Gibson and her team of professional dancers and choreographers as they live and work in the highly competitive dance and entertainment industry, preparing for variety of performances around the world. The Dance Scene premiered April 10, 2011 on the E! Network in the United States, and has since been broadcast in countries around the world.

Cast

 Laurieann Gibson
 Kherington Payne
 Sarah Mitchell
 Paula Van Oppen
 Richard Jackson
 Lacee Franks
 Joe "Flip" Wilson
 Paul Kirkland

Episodes

References

External links
 

Dance television shows
2010s American reality television series
2010 American television series debuts
2010 American television series endings
English-language television shows
E! original programming